Achaea oedipodina is a species of moth of the family Erebidae first described by Paul Mabille in 1879. It is found in Africa, including Madagascar, Réunion and the Seychelles.

Its wingspan is around 65 mm. Its larvae feed on Euphorbiaceae species, including Euphoria milii and Acalypha wilkesinia.

References

Achaea (moth)
Moths of Madagascar
Moths of Réunion
Erebid moths of Africa
Moths described in 1879